Éveux is a commune in the Rhône department in eastern France.

See also
 Sainte Marie de La Tourette
Communes of the Rhône department

References

External links 

 Official Web site

Communes of Rhône (department)